Mesocrambus is a genus of moths of the family Crambidae.

Species
Mesocrambus canariensis Ganev, 1987
Mesocrambus candiellus (Herrich-Schäffer, 1849)
Mesocrambus tamsi Bleszynski, 1960

References

Natural History Museum Lepidoptera genus database

Crambinae
Crambidae genera
Taxa named by Stanisław Błeszyński